Aegon N.V. is a Dutch multinational life insurance, pensions and asset management company

Aegon may also refer to:
 Aegon UK, subsidiary company
 Aegon Life Insurance Company
 Ægon, a playable character in Marvel Contest of Champions
 Several fictional characters in George R.R. Martin's A Song of Ice and Fire novels; see Aegon Targaryen